Carus-Verlag is a German music publisher founded in 1972 and based in Stuttgart.

Carus was founded by choral conductor Günter Graulich and his wife Waltraud with an emphasis on choral repertoire. The catalogue currently includes more than 26,000 works (January 2016).

The company produces the standard editions of the complete works of Josef Rheinberger and Max Reger.

Record label
The company also produces CDs to accompany some of its printed editions. Currently the publishers are working on recordings accompanying the complete editions of Wilhelm Friedemann Bach. Opera rarities include Schubert's Sakuntala and Johann Rudolf Zumsteeg's Die Geisterinsel.

References

External links

Gunter Graulich Interview - NAMM Oral History Library (2004)

Classical music record labels
Music publishing companies of Germany
Sheet music publishing companies
Publishing companies established in 1972
Companies based in Stuttgart
Mass media in Stuttgart
1972 establishments in West Germany